Oxyuris is a genus of nematodes belonging to the family Oxyuridae.

The genus has cosmopolitan distribution.

Species:

Oxyuris alata 
Oxyuris armata 
Oxyuris curvula 
Oxyuris equi 
Oxyuris flagellum 
Oxyuris karamoja 
Oxyuris megaloon 
Oxyuris obvelata 
Oxyuris paradoxa 
Oxyuris parallela 
Oxyuris praeputialis 
Oxyuris pugio 
Oxyuris semilanceolata 
Oxyuris sumatrensis 
Oxyuris tenuicauda

References

Nematodes